Azua may refer to:

Places
 Azua Province in the Dominican Republic
 Azua (city), capital of Azua province in the Dominican Republic
 Battle of Azua, fought 1844 between Dominican and Haitian forces

Other
 Azúa (surname)
 Australian ZX Users' Association (AZUA)